"Get the Funk Out" is the fourth track and second single from Extreme's second studio album Pornograffitti. It features rock artist Pat Travers. The official music video for the song was directed by Andy Morahan.

Track listings
 "Get the Funk Out" - 4:24
 "Li'l Jack Horny" - 4:51
 "Mutha (Don't Wanna Go To School Today)" (Remix) - 4:52

References

1990 songs
1990 singles
Extreme (band) songs
Music videos directed by Andy Morahan
Songs written by Nuno Bettencourt
Songs written by Gary Cherone
A&M Records singles